Peter T. Anderson (July 4, 1847 – July 25, 1907) served in the Union Army during the American Civil War. He received the Medal of Honor for his actions during the Battle of Bentonville.

Anderson was born July 4, 1847 in Lafayette County, Wisconsin. He enlisted in the 31st Wisconsin Volunteer Infantry in September 1863 and was mustered out in July 1865. He received a brevet promotion to Captain two years later. He died July 25, 1907 and was buried in Newell Cemetery, Newell, Iowa.

Medal of Honor citation
His award citation reads:

For extraordinary heroism on 19 March 1865, while serving with Company B, 31st Wisconsin Infantry, in action at Bentonville, North Carolina. Entirely unassisted, Private Anderson brought from the field an abandoned piece of artillery and saved the gun from falling into the hands of the enemy.

See also
List of American Civil War Medal of Honor recipients

References
Inline

General

1847 births
1907 deaths
People of Wisconsin in the American Civil War
People from Darlington, Wisconsin
United States Army Medal of Honor recipients
Union Army soldiers
Union Army officers
American Civil War recipients of the Medal of Honor